Granada Towers is a historic apartment building located at Long Beach in Nassau County, New York. It was designed in 1929 in the Spanish Revival style.  It consists of three connected towers, each seven stories tall.  It is built of orange-brown brick with terra cotta and stucco trim.  The entry has terra cotta pilasters, with spindle shafts and composite capitals.

It was listed on the National Register of Historic Places in 1984.

References

Residential buildings on the National Register of Historic Places in New York (state)
Spanish Colonial Revival architecture in New York (state)
Residential buildings completed in 1929
Buildings and structures in Nassau County, New York
Long Beach, New York
National Register of Historic Places in Hempstead (town), New York